Brennan Taylor is an American role-playing games author and publisher.

Career
Brennan Taylor is the CEO of Indie Press Revolution, which he co-founded with Ed Cha of Open World Press in 2004. When Taylor hired Fred Hicks of Evil Hat Games as a part-time staff member, Ron Edwards left IPR claiming that that this move would make IPR less friendly to the small press games companies that it was intended to serve. In 2010, Hero Games purchased Indie Press Revolution from Taylor and Cha. Although Taylor stepped down as President, he maintains a minority share.

Taylor is also the owner of Galileo Games, best known for the games Bulldogs!, Mortal Coil, and How We Came To Live Here. He is also the author of Hard Boilded Empires: Solara, Old Gods: A Mortal Coil Campaign Frame, and The Jersey Side playset for the independent RPG, Fiasco.

References

External links
Galileo Games official website
http://www.indiepressrevolution.com/xcart/help.php?section=about
http://www.indiepressrevolution.com/xcart/search.php?mode=search&page=1

Indie role-playing game designers
Living people
Role-playing game designers
Year of birth missing (living people)